Sunny Ridge is a partly snow-free ridge that trends southward for 1 nautical mile (1.9 km) from the western extremity of Mount Weaver. It stands at the west side of and near the head of Scott Glacier. The ridge was scaled by the Ohio State University geological party in November 1962. So named by party leader George Doumani because of very sunny conditions during the climb.

References

Ridges of the Ross Dependency
Amundsen Coast